Eucalyptus bakeri, commonly known as Baker's mallee or the mallee box, is a eucalypt that is endemic to eastern Australia. It has fibrous bark on the trunk and smooth white or grey bark above, narrow lance-shaped leaves, flower buds in groups of between seven and thirteen, white flowers and hemispherical or shortened spherical fruit.

Description
It forms a lignotuber and has grey to brown, compact fibrous to flaky bark on the trunk and smooth white or grey bark above that sheds in ribbons through the year.

Flowering mainly occurs from June to August and the flowers are white.

Taxonomy and naming
Eucalyptus bakeri was first formally described in 1913 by Joseph Maiden from a specimen collected near Wallangarra in 1911 by Edward Swain. Maiden noted that the species is locally referred to as "Mallee Box". The specific epithet (bakeri) honours Richard Thomas Baker "who has done valuable work in connection with this genus".

Distribution and habitat
Baker's mallee occurs near Yetman and Warialda in New South Wales and near Roma, Talwood and Dalby in Queensland with an outlier in the White Mountains National Park. It grows in shrubland on shallow, sandy soils.

Use in horticulture
This eucalypt is able to tolerate drought and light frost and will grow in ordinary to enriched and mildly acidic or alkaline soils. It is cultivated for use in gardens as a bird attracting shade tree, windbreak or coppice which has a medium growth rate.

See also
List of Eucalyptus species

References

Trees of Australia
bakeri
Myrtales of Australia
Flora of Queensland
Flora of New South Wales
Plants described in 1913
Taxa named by Joseph Maiden